Science diplomacy is the use of scientific collaborations among nations to address common problems and to build constructive international partnerships.  Science diplomacy is a form of new diplomacy and has become an umbrella term to describe a number of formal or informal technical, research-based, academic or engineering exchanges, within the general field of international relations and the emerging field of global policy making.

Although diplomacy featuring science is ancient, science diplomacy began to formally emerge in the 1930s, and the term science diplomacy appeared shortly after the end of the Cold War. Science diplomacy is taken to involve the direct promotion of a country's national needs, and/or the direct promotion of cross-border interests, and/or the direct meeting of global challenges and needs, including via the United Nations system and relevant conferences. Its remit thus includes the global networked governance of such major global issues as development of renewable energy, management of climate change, fusion power, space exploration, and technology transfer.

Notable developments in science diplomacy may arise as the result of scientific conferences and can feature the creation of new organizations to promote science diplomacy. Examples include the 1931 founding of the International Council of Scientific Unions, now the International Council of Science (ICSU); CERN, founded in 1954; the International Space Station, which had its origin in the early 1980s; and the ITER nuclear fusion experiment, conceived of around the same time. In more recent years, science diplomacy has been applied to pandemics and to the new age space race, in the form of space diplomacy.

Background 
Science diplomacy, along with e.g. economic, digital or para-diplomacy, is a subcategory of the so-called new diplomacy, as opposed to the long-standing traditional diplomacy known to date. Science diplomacy is thus also a sub-field of international relations and typically involves at some level interactions between scholars and officials involved in diplomacy, although whether scientist diplomats or diplomat scientists are more effective is an open question.

That said, forms of science diplomacy originated in previous centuries. The great voyages of exploration and colonization brought with them science-based diplomacy – such as trade in rifles in North America – as a form of diplomacy of influence. The emergence of blocs during the era of industrial warfare also saw the deployment of technology as a means of influencing less developed countries, with the Cold War bringing ideologically bloc-based science diplomacy, in areas such as space exploration and the development of fission reactors and weapons, to its ultimate incarnation.

The term ‘science diplomacy’ only began to emerge following the end of the Cold War, in the early 2000s, as a description of the need for new strategic partnerships at the country level to promote “activities of international cooperation and compromise on issues with a heavy scientific input”, on issues of global concern, such as biosafety. This involved the development of strategic scientific relations between historical or potential rival countries or blocs as a way to promote scientific cooperation to the extent that it could hedge against diplomatic failures and reduce the potential for conflict. As one UNCTAD researcher stated, “These activities and resulting networks offer excellent opportunities to share resources and hedge against diplomatic failures through exchanging experiences, opening countries up to better funding opportunities from international sources and sharing organisational capacity and expertise.” In the second half of the first decade of the twenty-first century, calls for the promotion of science diplomacy emerged in earnest, especially between the West and former Soviet Union countries.

Definition 
The concept of science diplomacy in academic discourse is of relatively recent origin. The intensification of research, including attempts to define and classify practices that can be included in the science diplomacy category, date from the beginning of the 21st century. The attempts to conceptualise science diplomacy are still ongoing. There exists neither a clear-cut definition of the term nor a consensus on science diplomacy's stakeholders, instruments and activities. Science diplomacy as a discourse draws the attention of multiple social actors who present diverse interpretations of the concept. The debate is attended by researchers who treat science diplomacy as an empirical object and by actors who are or have been involved in science diplomacy practices in various ways. These are career diplomats, science counsellors/advisers, experts to national and international decision-making bodies, and politicians. They perceive science diplomacy through the lens of interests (national, group) and goals to be fulfilled. Therefore, the definition of science diplomacy is not based on analytical categories but draws its meaning from a compilation of different narratives, approaches and ideas of changing relations between science and politics, science and foreign policy and the evolution of diplomacy as an institution of international relations.

Types of activities
In January 2010, the Royal Society and the American Association for the Advancement of Science noted that "science diplomacy" refers to three main types of activities:
 “Science in diplomacy”: Science can provide advice to inform and support foreign policy objectives
 “Diplomacy for science”: Diplomacy can facilitate international scientific cooperation
 "Science for diplomacy”: Scientific cooperation can improve international relations

In 2017, the current and former science advisers to the Foreign Ministers of the United States, New Zealand, the UK and Japan framed science diplomacy as

 Actions designed to directly advance a country's national needs
 Actions designed to address cross-border interests
 Actions primarily designed to meet global needs and challenges 
Before the term science diplomacy was coined, such initiatives—-in the United States—were often called “smart power” or “soft power” by those in the field. The term, “soft power,” was coined by Joseph Nye of Harvard University in a 1990 book, Bound to Lead: The Changing Nature of American Power. In an editorial in the Washington Post that he cowrote with Richard Armitage, he said, "In a changing world, the United States should become a smarter power by once again investing in the global good -- by providing things that people and governments want but cannot attain without U.S. leadership. By complementing U.S. military and economic strength with greater investments in soft power, Washington can build the framework to tackle tough global challenges." His notion of "smart power" became popular with the term's use by members of the Clinton and Obama Administrations, although the Obama Administration also used the term science diplomacy.

Bridging the world through science

Science as a tool for diplomacy has been used for several decades and by many countries around the world. Science diplomacy can be seen as a form of networked and transnational governance, involving human collaboration, especially via United Nations bodies such as UNESCO. In particular, it suggests a means for helping manage paradigmatic and disruptive change. For instance, the sheer scale of the problem of climate change has caused researchers to call for the reinvention of science communication in order to address humanity's cognitive limits in coping with such a crisis, with the International Panel on Climate Change alone constituting a science-diplomacy nexus. Especially within the context of the Sustainable Development Goals, the first calls to begin seeing science and its products as global public goods which should be tasked to fundamentally improve the human condition, especially in countries which are facing catastrophic change, are being made. Science diplomacy challenges the way international relations operates as a field of human endeavor, presenting a ‘boundary problem’ involving actors from different social worlds.

There are numerous basic patterns via which scientific and technological advances influence international relations. These include:

 as a juggernaut or escaped genie with rapid and wide-ranging ramifications for the international system;
 as a game-changer and a conveyor of advantage and disadvantage to different actors in the international system;
 as a source of risks, issues and problems that must be addressed and managed by the international community;
 as key dimensions or enablers of international macro phenomena;
 as instruments of foreign policy or sources of technical information for the management of an ongoing international regime;
 as the subject of projects and institutions whose planning, design, implementation and management provide grist for the mill of international relations and diplomacy.:411

While both science and technology create new risks in and of themselves, they can also alert humanity of risks, such as global warming, in both cases transforming commerce, diplomacy, intelligence, investment, and war.

One of the earliest ventures in joint scientific cooperation was in 1931 with the creation of the International Council of Scientific Unions, now the International Council of Science (ICSU). Through partnerships with international science unions and national science members, the ICSU focuses resources and tools towards the further development of scientific solutions to the world's challenges such as climate change, sustainable development, polar research, and the universality of science.

The civilian scientific exchanges between the United States and the then Soviet Union throughout the Cold War provide another example of science diplomacy. These collaborations linked the two countries when official diplomatic connections were stalled. Today, the U.S. and Russia work together on the International Space Station and on the ITER nuclear fusion science experiment.

Another example is European Organization for Nuclear Research (CERN). Following a series of meetings, UNESCO hearings and a formal ratification by 12 member nations—Belgium, Denmark, France, the Federal Republic of Germany, Greece, Italy, the Netherlands, Norway, Sweden, Switzerland, the United Kingdom and Yugoslavia— CERN was created. At present, CERN is run by 20 European member states, but many non-European countries are also involved in different ways. Scientists from some 608 institutes and universities around the world use CERN's facilities.

Individuals who are not connected with the government have also practiced science diplomacy. For example, in 1957, American philanthropist Cyrus Eaton hosted a meeting of 22 scientists (seven from the United States, three each from the Soviet Union and Japan, two each from the United Kingdom and Canada, and one each from Australia, Austria, China, France, and Poland) in the village of Pugwash, Nova Scotia, Canada.  The stimulus for the gathering was a Manifesto issued on 9 July1955 by Bertrand Russell and Albert Einstein—and signed by Max Born, Percy Bridgman, Leopold Infeld, Frédéric Joliot-Curie, Herman Muller, Linus Pauling, Cecil Powell, Joseph Rotblat and Hideki Yukawa—which called upon scientists of all political persuasions to assemble to discuss the threat posed to civilization by the advent of thermonuclear weapons. The meetings eventually grew and gathered the attention of high level government officials. Since then, scientists have continued to gather at the Pugwash Conferences.

In 1967, the African Scientific Institute was created to help African scientists reach others through published materials, conferences, seminars and provide tools for those who lack them.  And in 1996, countries with interests in the Arctic came together to form the Arctic Council to discuss sustainable development and environmental protection.

In the beginning of the new century, the term "science diplomacy" gained popularity during the Obama administration, and academics called for a 'new era' of science diplomacy. In 2009, President Barack Obama called for partnership during his “A New Beginning” speech in Cairo, Egypt. These partnerships would include a greater focus on engagement of the Muslim world through science, technology, and innovation building and connecting scientists from the United States to scientists in Muslim-majority countries.

By the 2010s, the early emphasis on biosafety and plant genetic resources had given way to a longer list of specific risks for science diplomacy to address, including “the rising risks and dangers of climate change, a spread of infectious diseases, increasing energy costs, migration movements, and cultural clashes”.:675 Additional areas of interest include space exploration; the exploration of fundamental physics (e.g., CERN and ITER); the management of the polar regions; health research; the oil and mining sectors; fisheries; and international security, including global cybersecurity, as well as enormous geographic areas, such as the transatlantic and Indo-Pacific regions. Increasingly, science diplomacy has come to be seen as a multilateral endeavor to address both global challenges and the matter of global goods, via science internationals (such as the Malta Conferences); international NGOs, especially UN bodies; and various science-policy interfaces, such as the U.S. National Academies system.

Several U.S. Government agencies, including the White House   the State Department, and USAID have science and technology offices and advisors to aid with developing and creating S&T outreach policy. These advisors are regular speakers (e.g., J. Holdren, E.W. Colglazier, A. Dehgan, in 2010 and 2011) at meetings of the Science Diplomats Club of Washington, to strengthen links with foreign "science diplomats". E.W Colglazier and Alex Dehgan have also contributed to Science & Diplomacy.

Additionally, several non-profit organizations in the United States have continued science diplomacy practices in their work. CRDF Global, in partnership with the U.S. Department of State, launched the  Global Innovation through Science and Technology (GIST)  initiative in 2010 in Egypt with follow-up meetings in Malaysia and Morocco in 2011. In addition to the GIST Initiative, CRDF Global has been active in both the United States and in the Middle East on promoting science diplomacy through conferences, panel discussions and programs including the Iraqi Virtual Science Library, Maghreb Virtual Science Library, and the Afghanistan Virtual Science Library.

The American Association for the Advancement of Science (AAAS) established the Center for Science Diplomacy  whose goal is to use science and scientific cooperation to promote international understanding. “It approaches this goal by providing a forum for scientists, policy analysts, and policy-makers through whom they can share information and explore collaborative opportunities”. In March 2012, the center launched the quarterly publication  Science & Diplomacy    Additionally, CRDF Global, the Partnership for a Secure America and AAAS have worked together on science diplomacy initiatives and events.   Others, such as the Science and Development Network (SciDev.Net) have dedicated an entire portion of their website for science diplomacy related articles, events and op-ed pieces.

The European Union is also concerned with science diplomacy. Science collaboration is seen as a way to make diplomacy through "parallel means". Several EU-funded projects are currently exploring and conducting research on the topic of science diplomacy.

Implementing science diplomacy

The first major post-War science-based diplomatic initiative was the Baruch Plan, which sought to internationalize fission under the newly formed United Nations Atomic Energy Commission and stop an atomic arms race. When this failed, the Cold War resulted, and America developed a separate fission energy diplomatic program, the 'Atoms for Peace' initiative.

John F. Kennedy established a science and technology cooperation agreement with Japan in 1961 following appeals to repair the “broken dialogue” between the two countries’ intellectual communities after World War II. That agreement helped round out a tenuous relationship at the time rooted only in security concerns.

In the 1970s, Henry Kissinger requested, and took, several science initiatives to his talks with China. These initiatives focused on areas in which both countries could participate; as evidenced in the Shanghai Communiqués. In 1979, when official diplomatic ties were established between China and the U.S., science played a big role in the shaping of renewed efforts, and December 2010 marked the 30th anniversary of normalized relations between the United States and China.

The late 1980s saw the development of the International Thermonuclear Experimental Reactor (ITER), an international nuclear fusion research and engineering megaproject, which will be the world's largest magnetic confinement plasma physics experiment when it begins plasma operations in 2025. ITER began in 1985 as a Reagan–Gorbachev initiative with the equal participation of the Soviet Union, the European Atomic Energy Community, the United States, and Japan through the 1988–1998 initial design phases. Preparations for the first Gorbachev-Reagan Summit showed that there were no tangible agreements in the works for the summit. One energy research project, however, was being considered quietly by two physicists, Alvin Trivelpiece and Evgeny Velikhov. The project involved collaboration on the next phase of magnetic fusion research — the construction of a demonstration model. At the time, magnetic fusion research was ongoing in Japan, Europe, the Soviet Union and the US. Velikhov and Trivelpiece believed that taking the next step in fusion research would be beyond the budget of any of the key nations and that collaboration would be useful internationally.

A major bureaucratic fight erupted in the US government over the project. One argument against collaboration was that the Soviets would use it to steal US technology and know-how. A second was symbolic — the Soviet physicist Andrei Sakharov was in internal exile and the US was pushing the Soviet Union on its human rights record. The United States National Security Council convened a meeting under the direction of William Flynn Martin that resulted in a consensus that the US should go forward with the project, which will continue into the 2030s and 2040s.

In the years following the end of the Cold War, U.S. Congressman George E. Brown Jr. was an outspoken champion of science and technology issues, particularly in international relations. As Chairman of the House Science Committee, Rep. Brown promoted conservation and renewable energy sources, technology transfer, sustainable development, environmental degradation, and an agency devoted to civilian technology when there were few listeners, and even fewer converts. Consistent with his long-held conviction that the nation needed a coherent technology policy, Brown articulated his concept of a partnership between the public and private sectors to improve the nation's competitiveness. His concern for demonstrating the practical applications of advances in science and technology laid the foundation for what became the U.S. Civilian Research & Development Foundation, later CRDF Global—a private non-profit organization initially established to promote bilateral science and technology collaborations between the U.S. and newly independent states of the former Soviet Union. Brown also helped establish the White House Office of Science and Technology Policy, the Environmental Protection Agency, the (now defunct) Office of Technology Assessment and the first federal climate change research program in the Federal Climate Program Act of 1978.

On March 12, 2010, Congressman Howard Berman (D-CA) and Congressman Jeff Fortenberry (R-NE) introduced the Global Science Program for Security, Competitiveness, and Diplomacy Act, which proposed an increase in the application of science and scientific engagement in America's foreign policy.

Additionally, several non-profit organizations in the United States have continued science diplomacy practices in their work. CRDF Global, in partnership with the U.S. Department of State, launched the  Global Innovation through Science and Technology (GIST)  initiative in 2010 in Egypt with follow-up meetings in Malaysia and Morocco in 2011. In addition to the GIST Initiative, CRDF Global has been active in both the United States and in the Middle East on promoting science diplomacy through conferences, panel discussions and programs including the Iraqi Virtual Science Library, Maghreb Virtual Science Library, and the Afghanistan Virtual Science Library.

The American Association for the Advancement of Science (AAAS) established the Center for Science Diplomacy  whose goal is to use science and scientific cooperation to promote international understanding. “It approaches this goal by providing a forum for scientists, policy analysts, and policy-makers through whom they can share information and explore collaborative opportunities”. In March 2012, the center launched the quarterly publication Science & Diplomacy    Additionally, CRDF Global, the Partnership for a Secure America and AAAS have worked together on science diplomacy initiatives and events.   Others, such as the Science and Development Network (SciDev.Net) have dedicated an entire portion of their website for science diplomacy related articles, events and op-ed pieces.

The Malta Conferences Foundation seeks to provide a bridge to peace in the Middle East through science diplomacy. Starting in 2001, Dr. Zafra Lerman began working with the American Chemical Society Subcommittee on Scientific Freedom and Human Rights to develop a scientific conference that would bring together researchers from many different, often mutually hostile, nations in the Middle East so they could cooperatively work toward solving problems facing the region. With support from the American Chemical Society (ACS), International Union of Pure and Applied Chemistry (IUPAC), the Royal Society of Chemistry (RSC - England), and the Gesellschaft Deutscher Chemiker, the first conference was held on the island of Malta from December 6 to 11, 2003. Attendees included six Nobel Laureates and scientists from 15 Middle Eastern Countries (Bahrain, Egypt, Iran, Iraq, Israel, Jordan, Kuwait, Lebanon, Libya, Palestinian Authority, Qatar, Saudi Arabia, Syria, Turkey, and United Arab Emirates). The conference included five workshops to foster cross-border collaborations:

 Nanotechnology and material science
 Medicinal chemistry and natural products
 Alternative energy
 Science education for all levels
 Environment - Air and water quality
The organizers followed up by hosting a second meeting two years later, Malta II. The meeting was honored by United States Senator Dick Durbin in a speech on the floor of the U.S. Senate entitled "Chemists Working Cooperatively".

Lerman led the initiative to continue with the conferences and founded the Malta Conferences Foundation to support them. She secured the support of UNESCO, the United Nations Educational, Scientific, and Cultural Organization.

List of Malta Conferences

The American Association for the Advancement of Science awarded Zafra Lerman the 2014 Award for Science Diplomacy.

In Spain, in December 2018, a group of stakeholders and experts on science diplomacy from around the world coming together at a global conference in Madrid defined several principles and highlighted the benefits of science diplomacy. As a result, the “Madrid Declaration on Science Diplomacy” was signed by a group of high-level experts who contributed to the conference. It proclaims a common vision of science diplomacy in the future, emphasises the benefits science diplomacy can bring to tackling the global challenges of our time and outlines the principles needed to foster science diplomacy worldwide.

Importance of science diplomacy
In a speech at the 2008 Davos World Economic Forum, Microsoft Chairman Bill Gates, called for a new form of capitalism, that goes beyond traditional philanthropy and government aid. Citing examples ranging from the development of software for people who cannot read to developing vaccines at a price that Africans can afford, Gates noted that such projects “...provide a hint of what we can accomplish if people who are experts on needs in the developing world meet with scientists who understand what the breakthroughs are, whether it's in software or drugs.” He suggested that we need to develop a new business model that would allow a combination of the motivation to help humanity and the profit motive to drive development. He called it “creative capitalism,” capitalism leavened by a pinch of idealism and altruistic desire to better the lot of others.

Scientists and engineers have an important role to play in creating what New York Times columnist Tom Friedman calls a “flat world,” a world of economic opportunity made equal through electronic communication technologies.

UK Foreign Secretary David Miliband said, during the 2010 InterAcademy Panel of the British Royal Society, “The scientific world is fast becoming interdisciplinary, but the biggest interdisciplinary leap needed is to connect the worlds of science and politics.”

CEO of the American Association for the Advancement of Science Rush D. Holt, Jr. wrote, in his article, “Scientific Drivers for Diplomacy,” published in Science & Diplomacy: “Beyond providing knowledge and applications to benefit human welfare, scientific cooperation is a useful part of diplomacy—scientific cooperation to work on problems across borders and without boundaries, cooperation made possible by the international language and methodology of science, cooperation in examining evidence that allows scientists to get beyond ideologies and form relationships that allow diplomats to defuse politically explosive situations.” Holt was the U.S. representative for New Jersey's 12th congressional district from 1999 to 2015, and has a PhD in physics from New York University.

Many of the global challenges related to health, economic growth, and climate change lay at the intersection of science and international relations.

Science diplomacy and pandemics 
Global organizations, researchers, public health officials, countries, government officials, and clinicians have worked together to create effective measures of infection control and subsequent treatment. They continue to do so through sharing of resources, research data, ideas, and by putting into effect laws and regulations that can further advance scientific research. Without the collaborative efforts of such entities, the world would not have the vaccines and treatments we now possess for diseases that were once considered deadly such as tuberculosis, tetanus, polio, influenza, etc. Historically, science diplomacy has proved successful in diseases such as SARS, Ebola, Zika and continues to be relevant during the COVID-19 pandemic today.

Science diplomacy and space 

With the rise of privatized space exploration and the growing competition with nations across the globe in the new age space race, space diplomacy refers to a globalized effort by scientists, national officials, and private corporations to reach a consensus on what is safe, effective, and sustainable space travel. In addition to possible space jurisdictions to each country interested in space travel, science diplomacy and space, or space diplomacy, can involve considerations towards environmental pollution or a set of international laws and legislations, such as the Outer Space Treaty.

Science diplomacy and branding 

Instead of showcasing military power in international relations, public relations have become the core of public diplomacy. With the fragile and complex political realities among nations, through leveraging global challenges, e.g., climate change, terrorism, and recent pandemics, public diplomacy becomes a strategic trigger to position a nation or tackle some critical challenges. As such, branding, seen as a creative tool used by policymakers towards individual projects, national policy sectors, or nation-states, can be used as a tool for science diplomacy. Three layers of branding have been identified: place branding, policy branding, and policy tool branding. Place branding is often used in policy-making, as is the case of countries like Singapore, Taiwan, and the United Arab Emirates, which use education policies to attract foreign universities and position their countries as science-oriented. Also, public health policy during pandemics uses policy branding, especially for social campaigns. Despite the paucity of research on how branding can aid science diplomacy, it can be part of the equation to advance science diplomacy.

See also 

 Atoms for Peace
 Baruch Plan
 CERN
 International Space Station
 ITER
 Montreal Protocol
 Paris Agreement
 Science diplomacy and pandemics
 Soft power
 Sustainable Development Goals
 UNESCO

References

Further reading 
 Davis, Lloyd Spencer, Patman, Robert G., editor, (2014), Science diplomacy: new day or false dawn? .
 Krasnyak, Olga; Ruffini, Pierre-Bruno (2020), "Science Diplomacy", International Relations, Oxford University Press, .
 Ruffini, Pierre-Bruno, (2017), Science and diplomacy: a new dimension of international relations. Cham, Switzerland. .
 Turekian, V. (2018). "The evolution of science diplomacy", Global Policy 95(3), 5–7.
 The Art of Science Diplomacy (page 18) by Dr. Paula Dobriansky, Under Secretary of State for Democracy and Global Affairs (June 2006)
Is Science the Key to the Middle East? The American by Brent M. Eastwood (1 Feb 07)
 "Google and USAID Push Science Diplomacy" PCMag (March 2011), Michael Miller
 "Establishing Dialogues" Houston Chronicle, Edward P. Djerejian, Neal F. Lane & Kirstin R.W. Matthews, Mar 19, 2011
 On the Issues: Science Diplomacy, Sheldon Himmelfarb, US Institute of Peace
"Science diplomacy aids conflict reduction" San Diego Union-Tribune, Thomas R. Pickering & Peter Agre

External links
 Science & Diplomacy a quarterly publication from the AAAS Center for Science Diplomacy
http://www.scidev.net/en/science-and-innovation-policy/science-diplomacy SciDev.Net article portal
 Global Science Diplomacy, White House Office of Science and Technology Policy
https://www.science-diplomacy.eu/ European Union Science Diplomacy portal
 http://www.El-CSID.eu European Leadership in Cultural, Science and Innovation Diplomacy site
http://www.insscide.eu/ European Union Inventing a Shared Diplomacy for Europe site
https://www.s4d4c.eu/ European Union Using Science in/for Diplomacy for Addressing Global Challenges site

 
International relations
Types of diplomacy